Hănești Commune is a commune in Botoșani County, Western Moldavia, Romania. It is composed of five villages: Borolea, Hănești, Moara Jorii, Sărata-Basarab and Slobozia Hănești. The population is 2844 people, and the commune has an area of 6052 ha. The commune has three primary schools and five secondary schools.

History 

The first recorded usage of the name Hănești appears in a document by military leader Petru Rareș dated April 11, 1546.

Geography 

The Bașeu River runs through Hănești Commune, discharging into the Prut near Ștefănești, Botoșani.

References

Communes in Botoșani County
Localities in Western Moldavia